Sacred Squadron may refer to:

 Sacred Squadron (France), a military unit active during the final stages of Napoleon's retreat from Moscow in 1812
 Sacred Band (World War II), a Greek special forces unit formed in 1942